Napoleon Lapathiotis (31 October 1888 – 7 January 1944) was a Greek poet. A native of Athens, he began writing and publishing poetry when he was eleven. In 1907, along with others, he established the Igiso (Ἡγησώ, from the Attic Greek name Hēgēso) magazine, in which he published his works. In 1909, he graduated from the law school of the University of Athens. His first book of poems was published in 1939.

Personal life 
Lapathiotis was openly gay and had communist beliefs. Poor in later life and an opium addict, he committed suicide with a revolver on 7 January 1944.

The 1985 film Meteor and Shadow was based on his life.

Poems 

Famous poems by Lapathiotis include:
 Τὰ καημένα τὰ πουλάκια
 Τὰ χλωμά τὰ κοριτσάκια
 Ἔχω ἕνα ἀηδόνι...
 Ποιητής
 Μυστικό...
 Ἐπεισόδιο
 Ἡ χαρά
 Συντριβή
 Ἀναμνήσεις
 Our old song (Τὸ παλιό μας τραγοῦδι)
 Small song (Μικρὸ τραγοῦδι)
 Παραμύθι
 Πόθος
 Στὴ νυχτερινὸ κέντρο
 Χειμωνιάτικο τοπίο
 Ἐκ βαθέων
 Στὴ φυλακή...
 Κούραση
 Κλείσε τὰ παράθυρα
 Φαντάσματα
 Βαθύ κι ἐξαίσιο βράδυ
 Μοναξιά
 Ἑκάτης πάθη
 Νυχτερινό
 Οἱ μπερντέδες
 Ἐρωτικό
 Οἱ κύκνοι τὸ φθινόπωρο
 Λυπήσου
 Προσμένω πάλι
 Σπαρασμός
 Untitled (Ἄτιτλο)
 1939
 Φάντασμα
 Προσμονή
 Εἶμαι μόνος...
 Ἐρινύες
  (Βαο, γαο, δαο)
 Τ᾿ ἁπλὸ παιδί πού ἐγὼ ἀγαπῶ...
 Song (Τραγούδι)
 Ὅταν βραδιάζει
 Ἕνας χαμένος κύκλος
 Ἀποχαιρετισμοί στη μουσική
 Ἀποχαιρετισμός
 Ἀποχαιρετιστήριο
 Κραυγή

Other works 
 My Life (Ἡ Ζωή μου), unfinished autobiography
 Nero the tyrant (Νέρων ὁ Τύραννος), 1901, theatrical play for children

References

External links 
 

1888 births
1944 suicides
Gay poets
Modern Greek poets
Writers from Athens
Suicides by firearm in Greece
National and Kapodistrian University of Athens alumni
20th-century Greek poets
Greek male poets
Greek gay writers
20th-century Greek male writers
Greek LGBT poets
1944 deaths